is primarily a Japanese given name with multiple meanings, dependent on the characters used. 裕 means "abundant". 寛 means "generous, tolerant" and 浩 means "prosperous." Hiro is also an uncommon Spanish and Greek masculine name which is a variant form of Chairo and Jerome. It means "sacred name". It is also a Tahitian masculine given name with origins in Tahitian mythology.

People with the name
Notable people with the name include:

, a female Japanese light novelist
, Japanese painter/artist
, Japanese music producer (writer of Kumi Koda's "Taboo")
 Hiro (photographer) (1930–2021), American fashion photographer
, Japanese musician with the stage name Hiro
, Japanese manga artist and the creator of Rave Master and "Fairy Tail", among other manga
, Japanese businessman and former racing driver
Hiro Murai (born 1983), American filmmaker
, Japanese cameraman and journalist slain during the 2010 Thai political protests
, American cinematographer
, Japanese manga artist, once active under her previous pen name, Izumi Hiro
, Japanese model and actor
, a Japanese noblewoman and memoir writer
, a professional wrestler
, a Japanese professional wrestler 
, Japanese manga artist, character designer and illustrator
, Japanese voice actor and singer
, Japanese-Canadian actor and playwright
, Japanese singer and vocalist from MY FIRST STORY with the stage name Hiro
, Japanese video game composer and keyboardist, aka Master Hiro
, Japanese singer, lyricist, and composer, best known for Yu Yu Hakusho ending themes, "Unbalance na Kiss o Shite" and "Taiyō ga Mata Kagayaku Toki"
, American musician and co-founder of the Grammy Award-winning rock band Soundgarden
Hiro Poroiae (born 1986), Tahitian footballer
, a Japanese religious scholar and writer of Buddhism
, a Japanese botanist
, Japanese voice actor
, Japanese footballer
Hiro Peralta (born 1994), is a Filipino actor
, a Japanese wrestler and trainer 
, a Japanese composer, conductor and synthesizer player.
Hiro Ando (born 1973), a Japanese contemporary artist
, Japanese dancer and producer known as Hiro, leader of Exile
, popularly known by his stage name Hiro-X.

Fictional characters
Hiro Nakamura, a character in the American television series Heroes with the ability to time-travel
Hiro Hiyorimi, main protagonist of the series Princess Resurrection
Hiro Granger, a character in the Beyblade series
Hiro, a Hero Templates DS Version Marionette/Wooden mannequin Character in Isaac the Nintendo title, similar to the Golden Sun from Drawn to Life: The Next Chapter.
 Hiro Protagonist, a character in the science fiction novel Snow Crash
 Hiro Sohma, a character in the Fruits Basket anime and manga series
Hiroshi Nohara, a character from the Crayon Shin-Chan series
 Hiro, a character from the video game Bust a Groove
 Hiro, a character from the Hidamari Sketch comic strip
 Hiro, the main character in Lunar: Eternal Blue video game
 Hiro, a character in Ginga Densetsu Weed series
Hiiro, also known as Nora, a major supporting character in the manga/anime series Noragami.
Hiro Sakurai, a main character in the Original English-language manga Miki Falls
 Hiro, a Japanese steam engine character from the Thomas and Friends special "Hero of the Rails"
Hiro Fuse, a character from Scott Westerfeld's book, "Extras", of the Uglies series
Hiro the Mini Ninja, a player character in Mini Ninjas video game
Heero Yuy (ヒロ・ユイ, Hiro Yui), Pilot of the Zero suit and a main character in Mobile Suit Gundam Wing
Hiro Oozora, a character from Danball Senki W, one of the three protagonists.
 Hiro, one of the giant ninja toads from Mount Myoboku from the anime and manga series, Naruto.
Hiro Takachiho, Marvel character from the superhero team Big Hero 6, renamed Hiro Hamada in the 2014 film adaptation.
Hiro, a character from the anime Darling in the Franxx.
Hiro Hamada, the main character of the Disney movie Big Hero 6, and a character from the comic book of the same title
Hiro, one of the instructors in the video game Fitness Boxing 2: Rhythm and Exercise.
Hiro Amanokawa, the main character of Digimon Ghost Game
Hiro-Kala, a fictional supervillain in Marvel Comics
Hiro Okamura, a teenage mechanical genius from Japan first appeared as the Toyman in Superman (vol. 2) #177

Mythology
Hiro is the god of thieves in Tahiti mythology. He was the first builder of large canoes with planks sewn together called pahi.

See also
Hiroo (given name)

Notes

Japanese masculine given names
Japanese unisex given names
Polynesian masculine given names
Spanish masculine given names